Aykut Özer (born 1 January 1993) is a footballer who plays as a goalkeeper for Samsunspor in the Turkish TFF First League. Born in Germany, he represented Turkey at various youth international levels up to the under-21s.

International career
Özer was an unused sub throughout the 2011 UEFA European Under-19 Championship. He played for Turkey at the 2013 FIFA U-20 World Cup.

References

External links
 
 
 
 

1993 births
Living people
Sportspeople from Hanau
Turkish footballers
Turkey under-21 international footballers
Turkey youth international footballers
German footballers
Bundesliga players
Eintracht Frankfurt players
Eintracht Frankfurt II players
Kardemir Karabükspor footballers
Süper Lig players
Eerste Divisie players
Fortuna Sittard players
Fatih Karagümrük S.K. footballers
Samsunspor footballers
TFF First League players
Association football goalkeepers
Footballers from Hesse
German people of Turkish descent
Turkish expatriate footballers
German expatriate footballers
German expatriate sportspeople in the Netherlands
Expatriate footballers in the Netherlands
Turkish expatriate sportspeople in the Netherlands